"Walking the Wire" is a song by American pop rock band Imagine Dragons. The song was written by Dan Reynolds, Wayne Sermon, Ben McKee, Daniel Platzman, Robin Fredriksson, Mattias Larsson, Justin Tranter with production handled by Mattman & Robin. It was released to digital retailers on June 15, 2017, as the third promotional single released off their third studio album, Evolve.

Background
On June 15, "Walking the Wire" was made available for download with any purchase from the band's online shop. The song was accidentally released onto YouTube and Vevo a day earlier than planned, only to be taken down within a few hours.

Critical reception
Bobby Olivier of Billboard magazine wrote that the song "may be the band's most overtly pleasing pop anthem to date". Lauren Murphy of The Irish Times wrote: "Walking the Wire and Whatever It Takes are both arms-aloft anthems, but the more enjoyable tracks follow an 1980s pop template, like the Hall & Oates-style Make It Up to You and Start Over." Rob Harvilla of The Ringer wrote: "'Walking the Wire,' with a romantic and inspirational anthem that at least sands off the rough edges of all that bellowing/screeching, is the closest these guys have come to their own version of Katy Perry's 'Roar,' or OneRepublic's 'Counting Stars,' or Rachel Platten's 'Fight Song.'" Allen Pham of Daily Trojan wrote: "'Walking the Wire' is one of the usually songs on Evolve's tracklist. Though Imagine Dragons uses less acoustics and more country music here, the song is evidence of the group's potential to achieve 2017-style music stardom while not completely straying from their roots."

Charts

Weekly charts

Year-end charts

Certifications

References

2017 singles
2017 songs
Imagine Dragons songs
Song recordings produced by Mattman & Robin
Songs written by Dan Reynolds (musician)
Songs written by Justin Tranter
Songs written by Ben McKee
Songs written by Daniel Platzman
Songs written by Robin Fredriksson
Songs written by Mattias Larsson
Songs written by Wayne Sermon